Amersham A Cappella is a ladies' barbershop chorus affiliated with LABBS (The Ladies' Association of British Barbershop Singers).  The chorus is based in Amersham, Buckinghamshire.

As a competing barbershop chorus, Amersham A Cappella have been awarded several awards and accolades – some of their more recent include:

 1st place at the 2016 LABBS Chorus Contest and
 2nd place at the 2015 LABBS Chorus Contest and 
 2nd place at the 2014 LABBS Chorus Contest and
 2nd place at the 2013 LABBS Chorus Contest and
 5th place at the 2013 European Barbershop Convention, in Veldhoven, The Netherlands,
 2nd place at the 2012 LABBS Chorus Contest and
 1st place at the 2012 Majestic Choir of the Year competition.

The chorus has just around 70 members, from all walks of life, who mostly live in or around Buckinghamshire (with some travelling from further afield to be part of the chorus). As a registered charity itself, the chorus invests considerable time and effort working to support their local community, in particular by supporting charitable endeavours wherever possible.

Their album "Wow! It's Amersham A Cappella", released in 2016 came 2nd place in the International 2016 Contemporary A Cappella Awards for Best Barbershop Album of the Year.

History
The chorus was formed in January 1982 by Ian Stone – a member of the local men's barbershop group, initially as the "wives and girlfriends" of that chorus.  The group was called Chiltern Harmony, and under Ian Stone's direction, became members of LABBS (The Ladies' Association of British Barbershop Singers) later that year.  Over the next few years the chorus grew in number and won a number of accolades as chorus directorship was passed from Ian Stone to Wendy Searle to Gay McBride, and is currently directed by Helen Lappert.

In 2007, to match the young, dynamic vibe of the chorus, the group changed its name to Amersham A Cappella, the name by which the chorus is known today.

Accolades and appearances
The accolades won by the chorus are numerous: three gold medals at LABBS (1995, 2010 and 2016), three silver medals and a bronze, and a number of independently adjudicated choral competitions, to include the 2010 Good Housekeeping Choir of The Year.

The chorus performed their version of Swing Low, Sweet Chariot on the pitch in May 2012 at Twickenham Stadium For the England Rugby team vs. Barbarians 2012 Mid Year Test, and again for the same match in 2013.

In November 2012, Amersham A Cappella supported the Innocent Drinks Big Knit campaign by writing and recording a viral for their site.

References

External links
Amersham A Cappella Official Site
Amersham A Cappella Facebook Page

Barbershop music
Musical groups from Buckinghamshire
A cappella musical groups